Sarah Gooll Putnam (1851–1912) was an American painter. From a prominent Boston family, she was known for her portraits and landscapes.

Biography
Putnam was born in 1851 in Boston, Massachusetts. As a young girl she made sketches and later worked in oils and watercolors. She studied art in New York, Munich, and Holland, and painted  portraits of family, friends, and other Bostonians of her social standing. She studied with Helen M. Knowlton, Louisa Crowninshield Bacon, and George Chickering Munzig before enrolling in the first class of students at the School of the Museum of Fine Arts, Boston in 1877.

Putnam received her first portrait commission in 1883 and went on to have several one-woman shows, and was included in group shows at the St. Botolph Club, the Boston Art Club and the Museum of Fine Arts, Boston.

Putnam exhibited her work at the 1893 World's Columbian Exposition in Chicago, Illinois.

Putnam never married and she died in 1912 in Chocorua, New Hampshire.

Diaries 
Sarah Gooll Putnam kept a consistent collection of diaries beginning at age nine (November 26, 1860). The documents are a record of her career as a portrait painter, her extensive travels, and significant historic moments. When she was fourteen, Abraham Lincoln was assassinated on April 14, 1865. Though primarily living in Boston, Massachusetts, she recorded the shock and sadness of hearing about the Lincoln assassination.

Legacy
Putnam's diaries from 1860 to 1912 are in the Massachusetts Historical Society. Several of her portraits are in Harvard Art Museums.

Gallery

References

External links

1851 births
1912 deaths
American women painters
19th-century American women artists
20th-century American women artists
19th-century American painters
20th-century American painters